Yaroslav Vynokur (born 6 June 1974, Odessa, Ukrainian SSR) is a professional Russian billiards player from Ukraine.  He is a two-time Ukraine and World Champion. Besides Russian billiards, he also plays American pool.

He is also the joint owner of the billiards club "Odyn" (One) in Odessa, which is the largest billiards club in Ukraine. It measures 1,500 square metres and offers Russian billiards, pool and snooker.

Achievements
 2004 Russian Pyramid Ukraine Championship
 2003 WPA World Pyramid Championship
 2004 Russian Pyramid Ukraine Championship
 2003 Russian Pyramid Eurasia Championship
 2002 Russian Pyramid Asia Open Cup

References

American Billiards in Kyiv’s Tampere Movie Theater, The Day. Retrieved on 13 February 2010.

1974 births
Living people
Sportspeople from Odesa
Ukrainian Jews
Ukrainian pool players